Kandersteg is a railway station in the Swiss canton of Bern and municipality of Kandersteg. The station is located on the Lötschberg line of the BLS AG, and is the first station to the north of the Lötschberg tunnel.

The station is served by the following passenger train:

The station is also the northern terminus of the BLS car carrying shuttle train to Goppenstein station via the Lötschberg tunnel, with trains running every 30 minutes. There is no road across the Lötschen Pass, under which the tunnel runs, and the nearest alternative road crossings lie many kilometres to the east and west.

The station is also served by PostAuto bus services to Mitholz, Blausee, Kandergrund and Frutigen and to Selden in the Gastertal.

Gallery

References

External links 

Railway stations in the canton of Bern
BLS railway stations